Cypripedium elegans is a lady's-slipper orchid found in Nepal, Bhutan, the Indian Himalayas, Tibet, and Yunnan. It grows in thickets, forest margins and humus rich soil in forests.

References

External links 
 Flowers of India, Elegant Slipper Orchid
 Swiss Orchid Foundation at the Herbarium Jany Renz

elegans
Plants described in 1886
Orchids of China
Orchids of Nepal
Flora of West Himalaya
Flora of East Himalaya